Tamara Cheek ( Jenkins; born August 20, 1978) is an American sprint kayaker who competed in the early 2000s. At the 2000 Summer Olympics in Sydney, she was eliminated in the semifinals of the K-2 500 m event.

She founded Vicaso.

She also co-founded the consulting firm Optimized Athlete.

Tamara Cheek is married to Joey Cheek.

References

External links

Sports-Reference.com profile

Living people
American female canoeists
Canoeists at the 2000 Summer Olympics
Olympic canoeists of the United States
1978 births
21st-century American women